Al Darb is one of the governorates in Jizan Region, Saudi Arabia.

References 

Populated places in Jizan Province
Governorates of Saudi Arabia